José de Jesús Madera Uribe MSpS (November 27, 1927 – January 21, 2017) was an American prelate of the Roman Catholic Church. He served as an auxiliary bishop of the Archdiocese for the Military Services, USA from 1991 to 2004.  He previously served as bishop of the Diocese of Fresno in California from 1980 to 1991.

Biography

Early life 
José de Jesús Madera Uribe was born in San Francisco, California on November 27, 1927 to Jesus Madera Flores and Paz Uribe Santana. He was raised in El Grullo, Jalisco , Mexico with his seven siblings.Deciding to study for the priesthood, Madera Uribe entered the Missionaries of the Holy Spirit, professing his vows on March 10, 1948.

Priesthood 
Madera Uribe was ordained a priest for the Missionaries of the Holy Spirit on June 15, 1957.  For the next 15 years, he served as a parish priest in the Archdiocese of Los Angeles.

Coadjutor Bishop and Bishop of Fresno 
On December 18, 1979, Pope John Paul II appointed Madera Uribe as coadjutor bishop of the Diocese of Fresno;  he was consecrated bishop on March 4, 1980 by Cardinal Roger Mahony. Madera Uribe succeeded as bishop of the diocese on June 1, 1980.

Auxiliary Bishop of the Archdiocese for the Military Services, USA 
On May 28, 1991, John Paul II appointed Madera Uribe as an auxiliary bishop of the Archdiocese for the Military Services, USA. 

John Paul II accepted Madera Uribe's retirement as bishop on September 14, 2004.  José Madera Uribe died in Culver City , California, on January 21, 2017.

See also

 Catholic Church hierarchy
 Catholic Church in the United States
 Historical list of the Catholic bishops of the United States
 Insignia of Chaplain Schools in the US Military
 List of Catholic bishops of the United States
 List of Catholic bishops of the United States: military service
 Lists of patriarchs, archbishops, and bishops
 Military chaplain
 Religious symbolism in the United States military
 United States military chaplains

References

External links
 Roman Catholic Diocese of Fresno, official website
 Archdiocese for the Military Services of the United States
Missionaries of the Holy Spirit website in Spanish

Episcopal succession

1927 births
2017 deaths
Clergy from San Francisco
20th-century Roman Catholic bishops in the United States
American military chaplains
Chaplains
Catholics from California
21st-century Roman Catholic bishops in the United States